María Emilia Undurraga Marimón (born 1975) is a Chilean politician, sociologist and agronomist. She has served as minister of agriculture in the government of Chilean President Sebastián Piñera.

References

External links
 

1975 births
Living people
Chilean people
Pontifical Catholic University of Chile alumni
Duke University alumni
21st-century Chilean politicians
Evópoli politicians
Ministers of Agriculture of Chile
Women government ministers of Chile